ETS-related transcription factor Elf-4 is a protein that in humans is encoded by the ELF4 gene.

References

Further reading

External links 
 

Transcription factors